The smooth handfish (Sympterichthys unipennis) is a possibly extinct species of handfish in the genus Sympterichthys. It was endemic to waters off the coast of Tasmania, mainly the D’Entrecasteaux Channel. It was declared extinct by the IUCN Red List in 2020, marking the first entirely marine fish classified as such. However, in 2021 its status was changed to Data Deficient due to uncertainties over the exhaustiveness of the unsuccessful surveys to find this species.

In the past, it was likely reasonably common, as it was one of the first fish described on François Péron's 1802 survey of Australia and an individual was caught with a simple dipnet; this is the only known specimen of the species. When and how the species went extinct is relatively unclear, but it likely had to do with the intensive scallop and oyster harvesting that went on in the area between the 19th and mid-20th centuries which dredged every part of the channel, resulting in the destruction of critical habitat that the benthic handfish required.

In March 2020, the smooth handfish was the first modern-day marine fish to be officially declared extinct in the IUCN Red List. However, this was reversed in September 2021, as there is not sufficient data to confirm this status.

References 

Brachionichthyidae
†
Fish extinctions since 1500
smooth handfish
Taxa named by Georges Cuvier